Saint Mary South Eastern is a parliamentary constituency represented in the Parliament of Jamaica. It elects one Member of Parliament by the first past the post system of election. The constituency covers the south east part of Saint Mary Parish.

Representation

References 

Parliamentary constituencies of Jamaica

Saint Mary Parish, Jamaica